Croceitalea marina is a Gram-negative, rod-shaped and non-motile bacterium from the genus of Croceitalea which has been isolated from the Yellow Sea in China.

References

External links
Type strain of Croceitalea marina at BacDive -  the Bacterial Diversity Metadatabase

Flavobacteria
Bacteria described in 2017